The  Sammarinese Reformist Socialist Party (PSRS) was a social-democratic political party in San Marino formed from a regional split from the Party of Socialists and Democrats in Borgo Maggiore.

On 30 May 2012, the party merged with the New Socialist Party to form the modern-day Socialist Party.

References

Political parties established in 2009
Political parties disestablished in 2012
Defunct political parties in San Marino
Social democratic parties
2009 establishments in San Marino
2012 disestablishments in San Marino